The 1982 European Athletics Indoor Championships were held at Palasport di San Siro in Milan, a city in Italy, on 6 and 7 March 1982. It was the second time the championships were held in Milan after the 1978 edition.

Medal summary

Men

Women

Medal table

Participating nations

 (7)
 (10)
 (13)
 (8)
 (1)
 (12)
 (4)
 (25)
 (13)
 (6)
 (15)
 (38)
 (5)
 (10)
 (2)
 (3)
 (31)
 (16)
 (9)
 (11)
 (1)
 (37)
 (5)

See also
1982 in athletics (track and field)

References

External links
 Men – medallists at GBRathletics.com
 Women – medallists at GBRathletics.com

 
1982
European Indoor Championships
European Indoor Championships,1982
Sports competitions in Milan
1982,Athletics,European Indoor Championships
March 1982 sports events in Europe